Central European Tour Miskolc GP was a cycling race in Hungary, run between 2010 and 2014. It was held as part of the UCI Europe Tour as a 1.2 level race, the day before the Central European Tour Budapest GP.

Past winners

External links

Cycle races in Hungary
Recurring sporting events established in 2010
Recurring sporting events disestablished in 2014
UCI Europe Tour races
2010 establishments in Hungary
2014 disestablishments in Hungary
Summer events in Hungary